Andy McGann (1928-2004) was an Irish-American fiddle player and a celebrated exponent of Sligo-style fiddling. He was born in New York to immigrant parents from County Sligo, living first in west Harlem before moving as a child to Mott Haven in the Bronx. McGann received violin instruction from Catherine Brennan Grant, a teacher grounded in both classical and Irish traditional music, and played in parochial school orchestras. He also got informal instruction and encouragement from County Sligo fiddle great Michael Coleman, who was a friend of the family. At a very young age, McGann found a place among the elite of New York's Sligo-style fiddle players, including Coleman, Paddy Killoran, Martin Wynne, Louis Quinn and James "Lad" O'Beirne. In the 1950s, McGann formed a partnership with Longford-born fiddler Paddy Reynolds. With Reynolds and others, McGann played with The New York Céilí Band, an all-star group that traveled to Ireland in 1960 to compete at the All-Ireland fleadh cheoil in Boyle, County Roscommon.

McGann's first studio recording was the 1965 LP A Tribute to Michael Coleman with button accordionist Joe Burke and piano accompanist Felix Dolan. When Shanachie Records was established in the 1970s, McGann released a solo recording and a duet album with Paddy Reynolds - both with guitar backing from Paul Brady - as well as The Funny Reel, a reunion LP with Burke and Dolan.

Discography
1965 A Tribute to Michael Coleman (Shaskeen)
1976 Andy Mcgann & Paddy Reynolds (Shanachie)
1977 It's a Hard Road to Travel (Shanachie)
1979 The Funny Reel - Traditional Music of Ireland (Shanachie)

References

1928 births
2004 deaths
People from Harlem
Deaths from cancer in New York (state)
American fiddlers
Irish fiddlers
American people of Irish descent
20th-century American violinists